Valmir Pontes Arantes (born 16 May 1981) is a Brazilian footballer. He plays for SC Brühl.

Valmir was signed by FC Gossau in January 2007, and won promotion in summer 2007 to Swiss Challenge League.

External links
 CBF
Profile at Brühl
http://www.football.ch/sfl/1707/de/Kader.aspx?pId=103885

Brazilian footballers
Expatriate footballers in Switzerland
FC Wil players
FC Gossau players
Swiss Super League players
Association football midfielders
People from Umuarama
1981 births
Living people
FC Chur 97 players
Sportspeople from Paraná (state)